The 1919–20 Swiss International Ice Hockey Championship was the fifth edition of the international ice hockey championship in Switzerland. HC Rosey Gstaad, won the championship by defeating HC Servette in the final.

Championship

First round 
 HC Château-d'Oex - HC Bellerive Vevey II 5:0
 HC Servette II - HC Bern 2:0

Quarterfinals 
 HC Rosey Gstaad - HC Caux 11:0
 HC Bellerive Vevey - HC Château-d'Oex 4:1
 HC Servette - HC La Villa 6:3
 HC Nautique-Genève - HC Servette II 1:0

Semifinals 
 HC Rosey Gstaad - HC Bellerive Vevey 4:0
 HC Servette - HC Nautique-Genève 7:2

Final 
 HC Rosey Gstaad - HC Servette 3:2

External links 
Swiss Ice Hockey Federation – All-time results

International
Swiss International Ice Hockey Championship seasons